Federation of Pentecostal Churches may refer to:
Federation of Pentecostal Churches (Germany)
Federation of Pentecostal Churches (Italy)